Cervical motion tenderness or cervical excitation is a sign found on a gynecological pelvic examination suggestive of pelvic pathology. Classically, it is present in the setting of pelvic inflammatory disease (PID) or ectopic pregnancy and is of some use to help differentiate PID from appendicitis. It is also known colloquially as chandelier sign due to the pain being so excruciating upon bimanual pelvic exam (a part of a gynecological physical examination where two fingers are used to feel the anatomy of the pelvis) that it is as if the patient reaches up to motion the grabbing of a ceiling-mounted chandelier.
Seen in PID.

See also
 Cervix

References

Gynaecologic disorders
Medical signs
Symptoms and signs: Urinary system